Jaqson Kojoroski (born 3 January 1979) is a Brazilian handball player. He competed in the men's tournament at the 2004 Summer Olympics.

References

External links
 

1979 births
Living people
Brazilian male handball players
Olympic handball players of Brazil
Handball players at the 2004 Summer Olympics
Sportspeople from Santa Catarina (state)
Handball players at the 2003 Pan American Games
Handball players at the 2007 Pan American Games
Handball players at the 2011 Pan American Games
Pan American Games gold medalists for Brazil
Pan American Games silver medalists for Brazil
Pan American Games medalists in handball
Medalists at the 2007 Pan American Games
Medalists at the 2011 Pan American Games
21st-century Brazilian people